John Wallace Turnbull (January 8, 1936 – May 19, 2020) was a Canadian  politician, lawyer and judge. He served in the Legislative Assembly of New Brunswick from 1974 to 1978 as a Liberal member from the constituency of Saint John Harbour. He was appointed to the Supreme Court of New Brunswick (Court of Queen's Bench) in 1983.

References

1936 births
2020 deaths